Nick Baird CMG CVO (born 1962) is group corporate affairs director of energy firm, Centrica.  Before that he was  Chief Executive Officer of UK Trade & Investment. He is also a non executive director of NordAnglia inc, a Trustee of Kew Gardens, and a member of the Advisory Council of Sheffield University School of Management.

Career
He joined the Foreign and Commonwealth Office in 1983, with his first foreign posting being to Kuwait in 1986 then to the UK Representation to the EU in Brussels in 1989 as First Secretary, which he again served as Counsellor (Justice and Home Affairs) from 1998 to 2002. He then served from 1993-1997 as Private Secretary to the Parliamentary Under-Secretary of State, then as head of the unit covering the EU Intergovernmental conference. His next foreign posting was to Muscat as Deputy Head of Mission (1997). In 2002 he was appointed Head of the European Union Department, before being seconded the following year to direct immigration policy within the Home Office. Subsequently, he was Ambassador to Turkey, and Director-General Europe & Globalisation.  In July 2020, Carers UK announced that he has been appointed chair elect of the national charity supporting unpaid carers, commencing in October 2020. Source:

Sources
 UKTI

External links
 

Living people
1962 births
Ambassadors of the United Kingdom to Turkey
Companions of the Order of St Michael and St George
Commanders of the Royal Victorian Order